Abraham Jacob Bruck was a Russian educator, journalist, and author of works in Hebrew and in Russian.

Biography
Bruck was born in the district of Rossienny in 1820. He received his education at the Volozhin Yeshiva, but studied Hebrew grammar and the Russian, German, French, and English languages without the aid of a teacher. For many years he was instructor in Hebrew at the government school for Jewish boys in Kherson, and later established a private school for Jewish girls, which the government subsidized. For his zeal as an educator he was awarded a medal by the government.

He contributed extensively to Jewish periodicals, in Hebrew, Russian, and Yiddish. He was for many years a correspondent and writer for Kol Mevasser, and—in the 1880s—for the Yudishen folksblatt in Yekaterinoslav. The novel portrays the life of the Jews in Russia.

He died in Yekaterinoslav in 18 november 1893.

Selected publications

References
 

1820 births
1893 deaths
French–Hebrew translators
Hebrew-language writers
Jewish journalists
Jewish writers from the Russian Empire
Journalists from the Russian Empire
People from Raseiniai
Russian male journalists
Russian-language writers
Russian reporters and correspondents
Yiddish-language journalists